The 2015 European Youth Summer Olympic Festival was  held in Tbilisi, Georgia, between 26 July and 1 August 2015.

Sports

Venues

Schedule
The competition schedule for the 2017 European Youth Olympic Summer Festival is as follows:

Participant nations
Kosovo made its European Youth Summer Olympic Festival debut at these games.

Mascot
The mascot for this edition of European Youth Olympic Festival is named P.E.A.K.Y, which is based on a pheasant. Pheasant was chosen as the mascot due to the connection with a Georgian legend about the founding of Tbilisi. The name P.E.A.K.Y is a combination from the words "peak" and "youth".

Medal table

References

External links

 
European Youth Summer Olympic Festival
European Youth Summer Olympic Festival
European Youth Summer Olympic Festival
Youth Summer Olympic Festival
Multi-sport events in Georgia (country)
Youth sport in Georgia (country)
European Youth Summer Olympic Festival
Sports competitions in Tbilisi
2010s in Tbilisi
2015 in youth sport
July 2015 sports events in Europe
August 2015 sports events in Europe